(The) bottom of the well is an idiomatic phrase, referring to a position from which one has a limited perspective or opportunities.

It may also refer to:

 Bottom of the Well (song), a song by the Australian band Airbourne 
 Looking at the World from the Bottom of a Well, a single by the US singer Mike Doughty
 The Thing at the Bottom of the Well, a short story by US author Stephen King
 Song from the Bottom of a Well, a song by English singer Kevin Ayers
 The Bottom of the Well, a 1917 silent film in which Adele DeGarde acted
 Bottom of the Well, a level in the computer game The Legend of Zelda: Ocarina of Time
 Man in the bottom of the Well, a song by the Bill Kirchen 
See also:
 井底之蛙